Kunnummal  is a panchayath in Kozhikode district in the state of Kerala, India.

Demographics
 India census, Kunnummal had a population of 17498 with 8389 males and 9109 females.

Transportation
Kunnummal village connects to other parts of India through Vatakara city on the west and Kuttiady town on the east.  National highway No.66 passes through Vatakara and the northern stretch connects to Mangalore, Goa and Mumbai.  The southern stretch connects to Cochin and Trivandrum.  The eastern Highway  going through Kuttiady connects to Mananthavady, Mysore and Bangalore. The nearest airports are at Kannur and Kozhikode.  The nearest railway station is at Vatakara.

References

Villages in Kozhikode district
Vatakara area